Medina Central School District is a public school district that serves the village of Medina, NY as well as the towns of Ridgeway, Shelby, a small part of Barre, and a small part of Hartland which is in Niagara County.  The school district consists of 1,550 students in grades PK–12. PK–3 are taught at Oak Orchard Primary School. 4–6 are taught at Clifford H. Wise Intermediate School. 7–12 are taught at Medina Junior-Senior High School.  The school district is home to the Medina Mustang Marching Band, who has won fifteen state field band championships, with the most recent being in 2021. The Mustang Band has been asked to participate in Macy's Thanksgiving Day Parade and at Disney World.

Mark B. Kruzynski is superintendent.

Board of Education
The board is made up of seven members. Current board members are:
Arlene Pawlaczyk, President
Wendi Pencille, Vice President
Annette Allis
Dr. Ann Bunch
Lori Draper
LuAnn Tierney
Debbie Tompkins

Schools
Oak Orchard Elementary School (PreK-2), Principal - Jennifer Stearns
Clifford H. Wise Intermediate/Middle School (3-6), Principal - Christopher Hughes, Co-Principal - Daniel Doctor
Medina High School (7-12), Principal - Michael Cavanagh, Assistant Principal - Joel Reed

Sports
The Mustangs compete in the Niagara-Orleans League and in Class B of Section 6 in the NYSPHSAA.

Fall:              
Football (Combined with Lyndonville) (JV, Varsity)
Golf  (Varsity)
Boys' Soccer (Combined with Lyndonville)  (Modified, JV, Varsity) 
Girls' Soccer (Combined with Lyndonville) (Modified, JV, Varsity)
Boys' Cross Country (Combined with Lyndonville)
Girls' Cross Country (Combined with Lyndonville)
Girls' Volleyball (Modified, JV, Varsity)
Field Hockey (JV, Varsity)
Cheerleading 
Winter:
Wrestling
Boys' Basketball (Modified, JV, Varsity)
Girls' Basketball (Modified, JV, Varsity)
Boys' Swimming (Modified, Varsity)
Girls' Swimming (Modified, Varsity)
Cheerleading 
Spring:
Lacrosse (Modified, JV, Varsity)
Baseball (JV, Varsity)
Softball (JV, Varsity)
Boys' Track and Field (Modified, Varsity)
Girls' Track and Field (Modified, Varsity)
Tennis (Varsity)

References

External links
 

School districts in New York (state)
Education in Orleans County, New York